Shokhboz Khusniddin O'g'li Umarov (born 9 March 1999) is an Uzbekistani professional footballer who plays as a midfielder for Ordabasy.

Club career
He was born in Tashkent. He started his senior football career in 2018 as a member of AGMK, making his debut on November 4, 2018 in a away Uzbekistan Super League match against Sogdiana. Shokhboz came in the 76th minute, replacing Zohir Pirimov  In the 2018 season, he played 1 match for the capital club, the following season he played 2 matches in the Super League and 1 in the Uzbekistan Cup. At the beginning of 2020 he moved to Belarus, where he signed a contract until the end of the season with Energetik-BGU. He made his debut on 19 March 2020 in a home match against BATE Borisov. He scored his debut goal in the Premier League on 31 May 2020 in a home match of against Vitebsk.

On 15 July 2020, Umarov signed a contract with BATE Borisov, which became effective on 1 January 2021.

International career
He made his debut for the Uzbekistan national football team on 9 October 2021 in a friendly against Malaysia.

Honours
AGMK
2018 Uzbekistan Cup winner

References

External links

1999 births
Sportspeople from Tashkent
Living people
Uzbekistani footballers
Uzbekistan international footballers
Association football midfielders
Uzbekistan Super League players
Uzbekistani expatriate footballers
Expatriate footballers in Belarus
Expatriate footballers in Kazakhstan
FC AGMK players
FC Energetik-BGU Minsk players
FC BATE Borisov players
FC Ordabasy players